Naeem Haque is a Pakistani male model, actor, CEO, gymnast and interior architect.

Early life
The grandson of film producer Agha Ghulam Mohammad, active in the 50s and 60s, Naeem Haque has studied at Saint Martin's School of Art in London, and at the National College of Arts in Lahore, Pakistan.  He has also learned acting at AAFT, the Asian Institute of Film & Television.

Professional career

Modelling
He has appeared in the music videos Na Re Na by Ali Azmat and Chal Dil Merey by Ali Zafar, while also making noted ramp appearances in the London Fashion Week, Lakme Fashion Week and other well-known clothing trade shows and fashion events around the world.

Acting
He was launched as an actor in 2016 with the Geo TV drama Sangdil, while he made his big screen debut in 2017 with Yalghaar, followed by Maan Jao Naa in 2018, in both movies playing an antagonist.

Filmography

Television

Films

References

External links
 
 

Living people
Alumni of Saint Martin's School of Art
National College of Arts alumni
Pakistani male models
Pakistani male television actors
Pakistani male film actors
Pakistani architects
Pakistani gymnasts
Year of birth missing (living people)